Christine Engrand (born 7 May 1955) is a French politician from National Rally (RN) who has represented the Pas-de-Calais's 6th constituency of Pas-de-Calais in the National Assembly since 2022.

She defeated Minister of Health Brigitte Bourguignon in the second round.

See also 

 List of deputies of the 16th National Assembly of France

References 

Living people
1955 births
Deputies of the 16th National Assembly of the French Fifth Republic
Members of Parliament for Pas-de-Calais
Women members of the National Assembly (France)
National Rally (France) politicians
21st-century French politicians
21st-century French women politicians